Dwight Eisenhower High School is a public high school located in Decatur, Illinois. The school serves about 1,046 students in grades 9 to 12 in Decatur Public Schools District 61. Students from this school were featured on The N's Student Body, a show on which students competed against other students from their crosstown rival, MacArthur High School, to see who could lose the most weight for a $25,000 grand prize. Eisenhower High School organizes its students into communities divided by class, and has instituted a mandatory school uniform policy along with MacArthur High School. The fight song is "EHS Fight Song".

History 
Eisenhower High School was named after the World War II general and 34th President of the United States Dwight D. Eisenhower.

Athletics
Eisenhower's High School athletics participate in the Central State Eight Conference and are members of the Illinois High School Association.

Boys
Baseball
Basketball
Cross Country
Football
Golf
Soccer
Tennis
Track & Field
Wrestling

Girls
Basketball
Bowling
Cheerleading
Cross Country
Golf
Softball
Soccer
Tennis
Track & Field
Volleyball

Notable team state finishes
Boys Baseball: 1961-62 (1st)
Boys Basketball: 1975-76 (4th)
Boys Tennis: 1989-90 (2nd), 1990-91 (3rd)
Girls Bowling: 1990–91 (2nd), 1999–00 (3rd), 2000-01 (3rd)
Girls Golf: 1995-96 (2nd)
Group Interpretation: 1973-74 (2nd)

Notable alumni 
 Kim Chizevsky-Nicholls (IFBB bodybuilder) (Class of 1986)
 Jeff Innis (MLB)
 Bill Madlock (MLB)
 Brit Miller, former NFL fullback
 Kevin Roberson (MLB)
 Roe Skidmore (MLB)

References 

Buildings and structures in Decatur, Illinois
Public high schools in Illinois
Schools in Macon County, Illinois